Bahi District is one of the seven districts of the Dodoma Region of Tanzania. Bahi District is bordered to the north by Chemba District, to the east by Dodoma District and Chamwino District, and to the west by Singida Region. Its administrative seat is the town of Bahi.

According to the 2012 Tanzania National Census, the population of Bahi District was 221,645.

Transport
Paved trunk road T3 from Morogoro to the Rwandan border passes through the district.

The central railway of Tanzania passes through Bahi District as well and there is a train station in Bahi town. The new Standard Gauge Railway has a station at Bahi under construction in early 2023.

Administrative subdivisions
Administratively, the district is divided into four divisions namely, Mundemu, Chipanga, Bahi and Mwitikira.

As of 2017, Bahi District is further divided into 22 wards.

Wards

 Babayu
 Bahi
 Chali
 Chibelela
 Chikola
 Chifutuka
 Chipanga
 Ibihwa
 Ibugule
 Ilindi
 Kigwe
 Lamaiti
 Makanda
 Mpalanga
 Mpamantwa
 Mpinga
 Msisi
 Mtitaa
 Mundemu
 Mwitikira
 Nondwa
 Zanka

References

Districts of Dodoma Region